Allard is a neighbourhood in southwest Edmonton, Alberta, Canada that was established in 2007 through the adoption of the Allard Neighbourhood Area Structure Plan (NASP).

It is located within Heritage Valley and was originally considered Neighbourhood 8 within the Heritage Valley Servicing Concept Design Brief (SCDB). This neighborhood is named after the Doctor Charles Alexander Allard, an Edmonton-based surgeon, broadcaster, entrepreneur, innovator, industrialist, philanthropist, and visionary.

Allard is bounded on the west by the future extension of James Mowatt Trail SW, north by the future 25 Avenue SW, east by the Blackmud Creek and south by the city limits (41 Avenue SW).

Demographics 
In the City of Edmonton's 2016 municipal census, Allard had a population of  living in  dwellings.

Homeowners Association 
The Allard Homeowners Association  will be implemented approximately one year prior to substantial completion of the entire development. This is currently scheduled for the fall of 2019.

Public Schools 
Dr Lila Fahlman is a Kindergarten to grade 9 Edmonton Public School located in the Allard neighbourhood.

Surrounding neighbourhoods 
To the West of Allard is the neighbourhood of Desrochers, to the North East is Cavanagh and to the North is Callaghan. South of Allard is newly annexed lands from the County of Leduc.

References 

Neighbourhoods in Edmonton